Kutum is a town in the Sudanese state of North Darfur. The town is located along a wadi and therefore also known as Wadi Kutum. It lies north along the Marrah Mountains; the Kutum volcanic field is better known as the Tagabo Hills. As of 2006, it had a population of 45,000, predominantly of the Fur, Tunjur and Berti ethnicities. Kutum lies on one of the traditional north–south migration routes used by Darfuri pastoralists.

Facilities
The town hosts a local market which operates on Mondays and Thursdays. Other facilities in the town includes a hospital with basic medical and surgical services and a small botanical gardens alongside the Wadi and the market. Within the town two primary health care clinics also operate.

The town hosts a number of mosques, with the mosque at the market having a notable minaret.

Commercial services includes bakeries, groceries, public phone outlets, as well as mechanical services. As of November 2006 no formal banking services were available in the town.

Electricity is available a few hours most days from a communal generator. For most of the population, water is fetched from wells around the town.

History 

From September to November 1989, during the Chadian–Libyan conflict, Kutum was briefly occupied by Chadian forces.

During the Darfur conflict, which began in the early 21st century, the town experienced significant insecurity.  While mostly government-controlled, the ethnic groups of the inhabitants are associated with the rebel groups, and the town was briefly taken by the rebels in August 2003.  The area northeast of town is largely controlled by the rebel Sudan Liberation Movement, while 'Arab' militias such as the janjaweed are to the south and west. Two camps for internally displaced persons, Fatta Borno and Kassab, formed near the town.

Notes

Further reading 
 Grawert, Elke (1990) Impacts of male outmigration on women: case study of Kutum/Northern Darfur/Sudan (Discussion paper number 18, Sudanforschungsgruppe Bremen (Sudan Economy Research Group Bremen)) University of Bremen, Bremen, Germany,

External links
 "Kutum, Sudan" Falling Rain Genomics, Inc.
 "Kutum Map — Satellite Images of Kutum" Maplandia.com

Populated places in North Darfur
Darfur